Tommy Sylte (born 27 October 1971) is a retired Norwegian football striker.

Hailing from Volda, he made his debut for Volda TI in 1988, scoring in his first match. Ahead of the 1991 season he joined Hødd, getting his first-tier debut in 1995. He went on to play for, and eventually captain, Moss FK from 1996 through 1999 before finishing his career in Hødd.

References

1971 births
Living people
People from Volda
Norwegian footballers
IL Hødd players
Moss FK players
Norwegian First Division players
Eliteserien players
Association football forwards
Sportspeople from Møre og Romsdal